Mike Poulin (born December 17, 1985 in Kitchener, Ontario) is a professional lacrosse goaltender wearing #30 for the Georgia Swarm in the National Lacrosse League.  He formerly played for the Calgary Roughnecks, the Toronto Rock and the Boston Blazers.  He also plays for the Brooklin Redmen and formerly played with Kitchener-Waterloo Kodiaks and Six Nations Chiefs of Major Series Lacrosse.

Poulin was awarded the Goaltender of the Year Award in the 2012 NLL season. In the 2014 NLL season, he passed Curtis Palidwor to become the all-time Roughneck leader in minutes played with 3,946.

Poulin has played twice at the World Indoor Lacrosse Championship: He represented the Czech Republic in 2015 and Canada in 2019.

References

Awards

1985 births
Living people
Boston Blazers players
Calgary Roughnecks players
Toronto Rock players
Canadian lacrosse players
Lacrosse goaltenders
Lacrosse people from Ontario
Sportspeople from Kitchener, Ontario